Mule Barn Theatre, also known as the David Rankin Mule Barn, was a historic barn located at Tarkio, Atchison County, Missouri. It was built as a barn about 1891 and converted to a theatre by the former Tarkio College in 1966–1968.  It was an octagonal plan, three story, red brick building. It was destroyed in a 1989 fire.

It was listed on the National Register of Historic Places in 1970 and delisted in 1994.

References

Octagon barns in the United States
Former National Register of Historic Places in Missouri
Barns on the National Register of Historic Places in Missouri
Theatres on the National Register of Historic Places in Missouri
Buildings and structures completed in 1891
Theatres completed in 1968
Buildings and structures in Atchison County, Missouri
National Register of Historic Places in Atchison County, Missouri
Barn theatres